Paul Michael Teutul (born October 2, 1974) is one of the stars of the American reality television series American Chopper. He started working for his father (Paul John Teutul). Teutul was the chief designer and fabricator. Prior to this, he was head of the rail shop at Orange County Ironworks. He is the owner of Paul Jr. Designs, which manufactures custom motorcycles and sells branded clothing.
Teutul, along with his father and younger brother Michael, became celebrities when they became the focus of a reality television series American Chopper on Discovery Channel in 2002.

Early life
The oldest of four children, Teutul Jr. has two younger brothers: Daniel, the owner/general manager of Orange County Ironworks LLC, and Michael who featured on the television shows. The youngest of the Teutul children is sister Cristin, who currently works as a nurse in Rochester, New York. Paul's mother is Paula Teutul, his father's first wife.

Falling out
On the April 9, 2009 episode of American Chopper, following a disagreement with his father and business partner, Teutul's employment was terminated. They attempted to resolve their disagreements, and he returned to work for OCC. The April 30, 2009 episode reveals that Teutul ultimately decided to voluntarily terminate his employment as a full-time member of the staff. In subsequent episodes, Teutul returned to OCC as a consultant, helping with bike builds when his father was away from the shop, and on motorbike builds needing additional manpower.

Paul Jr. Designs

Teutul opened his own design firm Paul Jr. Designs, and, in 2009, designed a dog park in Montgomery, New York. His first product design was a "facelift" for Coleman's 10th anniversary "Roadtrip Grill" in 2010. On the February 4, 2010 American Chopper episode "Stewart-Haas Bike", Paul pitched a line of dog toys to Bamboo Pets.

It was reported in mid April 2010 by TMZ, that Paul Jr. planned to start his own motorcycle business to go head-to-head against OCC. The report states that Paul Jr. is bringing on several former OCC employees, including Michael Teutul, Vinnie DiMartino, Joe Puliafico, and Robert "Nub" Collard. After waiting out a one-year non-compete clause with Orange County Choppers, Paul Jr. began building motorcycles at PJD, which is featured on a new series, American Chopper: Senior vs. Junior, on the Discovery Channel. The company now competes directly with OCC. Former OCC employee Cody Connelly has since joined PJD. In 2014, PJD assembled two teams to create two Azeroth Choppers for Blizzard Entertainment's World of Warcraft which appeared in the game. In 2016, PJD created two bikes for the feature film Teenage Mutant Ninja Turtles: Out of the Shadows.

Lawsuit

Bankruptcy fraud 
Paul John, Paul Michael and his brother Daniel were named in a 2007 lawsuit alleging fraudulent transfer, brought on behalf of Turner Construction. This dates back to 2003 and a ruling in favor of Turner in 2005 concerning the original OC Iron Works company. It was alleged that assets were stripped from the OC Ironworks, transferring the viable assets, contracts and personnel to a new company OC Ironworks LLC, before bankrupting the former. This involved transferring the ownership to Paul Jr. and allegedly selling the assets to the new company with unfair compensation. Trustee Tom Genova filed fraud complaints in 2007 with the Bankruptcy Court and in complaint sought to have the transfers from the old company to the new company judged fraudulent and set aside. He also sought to make the new company liable for the old company's debts. A proposed settlement was reached with Orange County LLC paying out $500,000 to Genova to be distributed to the creditors.

Teutul v Teutul 
On February 16, 2011, the New York State Unified Court System's website, showed that the Teutul v Teutul civil action was no longer active. The case had been "Disposed", meaning the case was out of the court system. On the August 29, 2011 episode, Teutul Jr. and Teutul Sr. settled the lawsuit with Teutul Sr.'s purchase of Paul Jr.'s 20% share in Orange County Choppers ("OCC"), thus ending the lawsuit.

Personal life
On August 20, 2010, Teutul Jr. married Rachael Biester. They were on the TLC show Say Yes to the Dress. On February 3, 2015, his wife gave birth to their first son, Hudson Seven Teutul.

References

External links

 
 

1974 births
American Chopper
American television personalities
Living people
Motorcycle builders
Place of birth missing (living people)